Great Neck Estates is a village on the Great Neck Peninsula in the Town of North Hempstead, in Nassau County, on the North Shore of Long Island, in New York, United States. The population was 2,761 at the 2010 census.

History 
Great Neck Estates incorporated in 1911, making it the second village to incorporate on the Great Neck Peninsula. Residents felt that the incorporation was imperative in order to maintain home rule. They also felt that by incorporating, they would be able to have services which they otherwise would not be able to have through the Town of North Hempstead.

A plaque was installed at Village Hall in 1981 to commemorate the 70th Anniversary of Great Neck Estates' incorporation as a village.

In 1982, Great Neck Estates became the first village on Long Island to call for a nuclear freeze between the United States and the former Soviet Union after trustees approved of a petition started by three concerned residents on the Great Neck Peninsula. Copies of their document were delivered to the leaders of both nations as peace efforts.

Geography

Demographics

At the 2000 census there were 2,756 people, 919 households, and 767 families in the village. The population density was 3,581.3 people per square mile (1,381.9/km). There were 944 housing units at an average density of 1,226.7 per square mile (473.4/km).  The racial makeup of the village was 92.71% White, 0.94% African American, 4.83% Asian, 0.33% from other races, and 1.20% from two or more races. Hispanic or Latino of any race were 2.61%.

Of the 919 households 38.2% had children under the age of 18 living with them, 78.0% were married couples living together, 3.6% had a female householder with no husband present, and 16.5% were non-families. 14.6% of households were one person and 9.6% were one person aged 65 or older. The average household size was 3.00 and the average family size was 3.31.

The age distribution was 26.9% under the age of 18, 5.3% from 18 to 24, 20.9% from 25 to 44, 29.6% from 45 to 64, and 17.3% 65 or older. The median age was 43 years. For every 100 females, there were 92.9 males. For every 100 females age 18 and over, there were 88.9 males.

The median household income was $142,038 and the median family income  was $161,545. Males had a median income of $100,000 versus $55,938 for females. The per capita income for the village was $72,476. About 1.6% of families and 2.3% of the population were below the poverty line, including 2.4% of those under age 18 and none of those age 65 or over.

Government

Village government 
As of September 2021, the Mayor of Great Neck Estates is William D. Warner, the Deputy Mayor is Jeffrey Farkas, and the Village Trustees are Ira D. Ganzfried, Howard Hershenhorn, and Lanny Oppenheim.

Representation in higher government

Town representation 
Great Neck Estates is located in the Town of North Hempstead's 5th district, which as of September 2021 is represented on the Town Board by Lee R. Seeman (D–Great Neck).

Nassau County representation 
Great Neck Estates is located in Nassau County's 10th Legislative district, which as of January 2023 is represented in the Nassau County Legislature by Mazi Melesa Pilip (R–Great Neck).

New York State representation

New York State Assembly 
Great Neck Estates is located in the New York State Assembly's 16th Assembly district, which as of September 2021 is represented by Gina Sillitti (D–Manorhaven).

New York State Senate 
Great Neck Estates is located in the New York State Senate's 7th State Senate district, which as of September 2021 is represented in the New York State Senate by Anna Kaplan (D–North Hills).

Federal representation

United States Congress 
Great Neck Estates is located in New York's 3rd congressional district, which as of September 2021 is represented in the United States Congress by Tom Suozzi (D–Glen Cove).

United States Senate 
Like the rest of New York, Great Neck Estates is represented in the United States Senate by Charles Schumer (D) and Kirsten Gillibrand (D).

Politics 
In the 2016 U.S. presidential election, the majority of Great Neck Estates voters voted for Hillary Clinton (D).

Mayors of Great Neck Estates 
 William D. Warner
 David Fox
 Murray Seeman
 Lawrence Nadal
 Jean Margouleff

Education

School district 
Great Neck Estates is located entirely within the boundaries of the Great Neck Union Free School District. As such, all children who reside within the village and attend public schools go to Great Neck's schools.

Library district 
Great Neck Estates is located within the boundaries of the Great Neck Library District.

Landmark

 Ben Rebhuhn House – A home designed by Frank Lloyd Wright.

The Great Gatsby 
In the 1920s, F. Scott Fitzgerald lived in Great Neck, at 6 Gateway Drive in Great Neck Estates, which is probably Great Neck's greatest claim to fame. It was a modest house, not dissimilar to that of Nick, the protagonist of his novel, The Great Gatsby. It is said that Fitzgerald modeled West Egg, the fictional town in which Nick lived, next to the mansion of Jay Gatsby, after Great Neck (specifically Kings Point), for its epitome of nouveau riche gaudiness, atmosphere, and lifestyle. He modeled East Egg, the town where Daisy and Tom lived, after Great Neck's eastern neighbor Sands Point, which is part of Port Washington.

References

External links 

 Official website

Great Neck Peninsula
Town of North Hempstead, New York
Villages in New York (state)
Villages in Nassau County, New York